Aliki Kelihiano Kalolo is a Tokelauan politician who currently serves as Head of the Government of Tokelau, or  since 13 March 2013. He previously served in the same position from February 2012 to March 2013, again from 12 March 2019 to 9 March 2020, and again from 8 March 2021. He is a member of the Council for the Ongoing Government of Tokelau, serving as Minister for Foreign Affairs, Education, Economic Development, Natural Resources and the Environment, prior to and then simultaneously to his leadership of the government.

As , he oversaw the replacement of Tokelau's old ship, the MV Tokelau, which was considered no longer to be safe and seaworthy, with the newer, custom-built PB Matua, provided by New Zealand. In June 2012, Kalolo sacked his Minister for Transport, Foua Toloa, over the latter's insistence that the MV Tokelau was still seaworthy, and New Zealand Foreign Minister Murray McCully's indication that the New Zealand government could not work with Toloa.

Kalolo also oversaw the small country's transition from diesel-powered energy to solar energy, implemented by the New Zealand company Vector in 2012, this system was upgraded and repaired in 2020, also under his leadership.

In September 2012, he was appointed Chancellor of the regional University of the South Pacific. Prior to becoming , he had served as the University's co-ordinator in Tokelau.

He became  again in March 2019, replacing Afega Gaualofa. He was succeeded by Fofo Esera Tuisano.

He became  once again in March 2021, replacing Fofo Esera Tuisano.

In 2020, Kalolo drafted a referendum set for 2025 for the territory to gain more autonomy or possibly become independent from New Zealand.

His third term as  ended on 19 May 2022 and he was succeeded by Siopili Perez,  of Nukunonu.

He was elected Ulu once again on 6 March 2023.

References

Year of birth missing (living people)
Living people
Heads of Government of Tokelau
Members of the Parliament of Tokelau
Foreign Ministers of Tokelau
Government ministers of Tokelau
People from Atafu